Oltrumet is an administrative ward in the Arusha District of the Arusha Region of Tanzania. The name of the ward is from a Maasai word meaning a place of grazing. According to the 2012 census, the ward has a total population of 10,226.

References

Wards of Arusha District
Wards of Arusha Region